Paresh Maity (born 1965) is an Indian painter. He is a prolific painter in a short career span.

In 2014, Government of India conferred upon him its fourth-highest civilian award the Padma Shri.

Early life

Paresh Maity was born in Tamluk, Purba Medinipur, West Bengal. He has a degree in Fine Arts from the Government College of Art & Craft, Kolkata and graduated at the top of his class with a Masters of Fine Arts from the Delhi College of Arts.

Education
 B.V.A. Government College of Art & Craft, Kolkata
 M.F.A. College of Art, New Delhi

Career
Paresh Maity has 81 Solo Exhibitions in forty years of his career. In early years he did many watercolors of different locations. He gradually moved from atmospheric scenery to representations of the human form. His more recent paintings are bold and have graphic quality, with a strong color and unusual cropping. His works are in a number of collections, including the British Museum, and the National Gallery of Modern Art, New Delhi.

He has painted the longest painting in India, that stretches up to over 850 feet. In August 2010, his 55th solo show with watercolour paintings based on the last 15 poems of poet Rabindranath Tagore, Shesh Lekha (The Last Writings, 1941), opened at the National Gallery of Modern Art, New Delhi.

Personal life

He is married to artist Jayasri Burman, and lives and works in New Delhi. His house was designed by master architect Abin Chaudhari

Selected exhibitions
81 Solo Exhibitions worldwide.
 2019 : Art Central, Hong Kong
 2019 : Visual Art Centre, Hong Kong
 2017 : Jehangir Art Gallery, Mumbai, presented by Art Musings
 2017 : Forty Years of Watercolour, Lalit Kala Academi, New Delhi, presented by Art Alive Gallery
 2017 : Lalit Kala Academi, Chennai presented by Gallery Sumukha
 2017 : Art Stage Singapore, presented by Gallery Sumukha, Marina Bay Sands, Singapore
 2016 : ‘Beyond Horizons’, Gallery Sumukha, Bangalore
 2016 :  Art 16 presented by Gallery Sumukha, Olympia, London
 2016 :  Art Stage Singapore, presented by Sanchit Art, Marina Bay Sands, Singapore
 2015 :  CIMA Gallery, Birla Academi of Art & Culture, Kolkata
 2015 :  Sydney Contemporary Art Fair, Sydney, Australia
 2015 :  Art 15 presented by Gallery Sumukha, Olympia, London
 2015 :  Art Stage Singapore, presented by Gallery Sumukha, Marina Bay Sands, Singapore
 2014 :  The Arts House, presented by Gallery Sumukha, Singapore
 2014 :  Art Stage Singapore, presented by Gallery Sumukha, Marina Bay Sands, Singapore
 2014 :  Art 14, presented by Gallery Sumukha, Olympia, London
 2013 :  Jehangir Art Gallery, Mumbai, in collaboration with Art Musings
 2013 :  Art 13, London Olympia, Singapore presented by Gallery Sumukha
 2013 :  Visual Arts Gallery, presented by Gallery Sumukha, Hong Kong
 2012 :  ‘Eternal Landscape’, joint show with Ram Kumar at ICIA, Mumbai
 2012 :  Solo Exhibition Chennai presented by Gallery Sumukha as a part of Chennai Art Festival
 2012 : The Arts House, presented by Gallery Sumukha, Singapore
 2012 : Art Stage Singapore, presented by Gallery Sumukha, Marina Bay Sands, Singapore
 2012 : ‘Kolkata Taj Bengal’, presented by Jaguar Land Rover with Gallery Sanskriti, Kolkata
 2011 : Chivas Studio, New Delhi and Mumbai
 2011 : Gallery Sumukha in association with Wei-Ling Contemporary, Malaysia in Bangalore & Kuala Lumpur
 2011 : Art Stage Singapore, presented by Gallery Sumukha, Marina Bay Sands, Singapore
 2011 : ‘Shesh Lekha’, Poems by Rabindranath Tagore translated in English by Pritish Nandy 
 2011 : interpreted by Paresh Maity, NGMA, New Delhi, Mumbai, supported by Art Alive Gallery, New Delhi
 2011 : ‘Shesh Lekha’, Tao Gallery, Mumbai and CIMA Gallery, Kolkata
 2010 : Joint show with Steve McCurry, Chicago, Tourism Centre in association with Art Alive Gallery.
 2010 : Group show, Shizaru Art Gallery, London
 2010 : ‘The World on a Canvas’, Art Alive Gallery, Lalit Kala Akademi, New Delhi
 2009 : Montage, Moments & Memories, Art Musings, Jehangir Art Gallery, Mumbai
 2008 : Gallery Sumukha, Chennai
 2018 : An Enchanting Journey, Art Alive Gallery, New Delhi
 2007 : CIMA Gallery, Kolkata
 2006 : Aicon Gallery, Palo Alto, USA
 2006 : Visual Arts Gallery, presented by Gallery Sumukha, Hong Kong
 2005 : Jehangir Art Gallery, Mumbai, in collaboration with Art Musings
 2005 : Arts India, New York. Gallery in Cork Street, London, in association with ICICI Bank
 2004 : Alliance Francaise, Singapore, presented by Gallery Sumukha with Easel, Singapore. CIMA Art Gallery, Kolkata
 2003 : ‘Shapes in Symphony’, Gallerie Ganesha, New Delhi
 2002 : Arts India, New York; Venetian Odyssey, British Council, New Delhi
 2002 : Tagore Centre, Berlin, Germany
 2001 : ‘Venetian Odyssey’, Jehangir Art Gallery, Mumbai; British Council, New Delhi
 2001 : Philip Gallery, London
 2000 : CIMA Art Gallery, Kolkata; Gallerie Aspekte, Germany
 2000 : ‘Venetian Odyssey’, Hotel Aryanbika, Debrecen, Hungar; Gallerie Mohanjeet, Paris
 1999 : Two Decades of Classic Watercolours, Shridharani, Triveni Kala Sangam,
 1999 : Gallerie Ganesha, and British Council, New Delhi; Gallery Sumukha, Bangalore
 1998 : Jehangir Art Gallery, Mumbai; Cymroza Art Gallery, Mumbai
 1997 : CIMA Gallery, Kolkata; Aquarell International, Thun, Switzerland
 1996 : Shridharani Gallery, Triveni Kala Sangam, New Delhi; Hungarian Information and Cultural Centre, New Delhi
 1996 : Gallerie Ganesha, New Delhi; ARKS Gallery, London 
 1996 : Paracelsus Rotenfleskdinik Ausgestelt, in association with Galerie Aspekte, Germany 
 1995 : Cymroza Art Gallery, Mumbai
 1994 : British Council, Kolkata; Gallerie Ganesha, New Delhi; The Gallery, Chennai 
 1994 : Galerie Aspekte, German; Shridharani Gallery, Triveni Kala Sangam, New Delhi
 1993 : Gallerie Ganesha, New Delhi; All India Fine Arts and Crafts Society, New Delhi
 1992 : Gallerie Ganesha, New Delhi; Birla Academy of Art and Culture, Kolkata 
 1992 : Cymroza Art Gallery, Mumbai; Siddhartha Art Gallery, Kathmandu; Windsor Manor, Bangalore
 1991 : Gallerie Ganesha, New Delhi; Gallery Katayun, Kolkata; Sophia Duchesne Art Gallery, Mumbai
 1990 : Gallerie Ganesha, New Delhi; Gallery Katayun, Kolkata
 1989 : Gallery Katayun, Kolkata
 1988 : Academy of Fine Arts, Kolkata
 1986 : Good Companions, Kolkata

Awards
 2017 : Award from Bihar Government
 2016 : Eastern Eye Editor’s Special Award for contribution in field of art in Royal Festival Hall, London
 2014 : Padma Shri Award by Government of India
 2014 : Cartier Award, St. Moritz. Switzerland Art Masters
 2013 : Hall of Fame by Hello (Times of India Group)
 2013 : Sera Bengali Award in Kolkata by ABP
 2012 : Dayawati Modi Award for Art, Culture & Education
 2005 : Indo-American Society
 2002 : Royal Watercolour Society, London
 1999 : Harmony Award, Mumbai
 1993 : British Council Visitorship
 1992 : Pt. Ravishankar Award from College of Art, New Delhi
 1990 : All India Fine Arts and Craft Society Award for 62nd All India Art Exhibition, 
 1990 : New Delhi; Award for Outstanding Painting, Birla Academy of Art and Culture, Kolkata;
 1990 : All India Fine Arts and Crafts Society Award for Best Watercolour Painting, New Delhi
 1989 : National Scholarship Award, Government of India
 1988 : Pt. Jawaharlal Nehru Birth Centenary Celebration Award 
 1988 : Governor's Gold Medal from Academy of Fine Arts, Kolkata
 1987 : Jamini Roy Birth Centenary Celebration Award
 1986 : Award, Indian Society of Oriental Art, Kolkata
 1985 : Award, Government of West Bengal for Best Water Colour Painting Award,
 1985 : Indian Society of Oriental Art, Kolkata
 1983 : Gold Medal, USSR

Collections

Paresh Maity's works are featured in several private and public collections across the world which include

 Leela Palace, New Delhi, Chennai
 Ritz Carlton, Bengaluru
 Crown Plaza, London
 Quilon, London
 Leela Palace, Chennai
 Steller International Art Foundation, London
 British Museum, London
 Rubin Museum of Art, New York
 National Gallery of Modern Art, New Delhi
 Birla Academy of Art and Culture, Kolkata
 Oberoi Group of Hotels; ITC Limited
 Welcomgroup Hotels; Tata Iron & Steel Co. Ltd.
 Kirloskar; DCM Group of Companies
 Jindal Group of Companies; Singhania Group of Companies
 Standard Chartered Bank; Citibank; Ranbaxy Laboratories
 Godrej; Eicher Group; Dr. Reddy’s; Thapar Group
 Williamson Magor Limited; RPG Industries
 TAFE; Hindustan Computers Limited; Hindustan Lever
 CIPLA; SIEL: Jalans; MAX India; Mayo College, Ajme;
 Commonwealth Development Corporation, London
 Noon Group, London; Mathys Medical (P) Ltd.
 T-3, Indira Gandhi International Airport, New Delhi.
 Residency at Rashtrapati Bhawan (President’s House, India) 2016
 Represented in several private and public collections all over the world. 
 Lives and works in New Delhi, India

References

External links
Official site
World of Paresh Maity, The Tribune, September 10, 2006
Star power, The Telegraph, April 8, 2006

1965 births
Bengali Hindus
21st-century Bengalis
Indian male painters
Living people
Government College of Art & Craft alumni
University of Calcutta alumni
Artists from Kolkata
People from Purba Medinipur district
Bengali male artists
Indian watercolourists
Recipients of the Padma Shri in arts
Delhi University alumni
20th-century Indian painters
21st-century Indian painters
Painters from West Bengal
20th-century Indian male artists
21st-century Indian male artists
People from Tamluk